Let Me Know may refer to:

"Let Me Know" (Tamar Braxton song)
"Let Me Know" (Róisín Murphy song)
"Let Me Know" (Towa Tei song)
"Let Me Know (I Wonder Why Freestyle)", a song by Juice Wrld
"Let Me Know", a song by Janet Jackson from the album Discipline
"Let Me Know", a 2016 song by After 7
"Let Me Know", a 1993 song by Xscape from Hummin' Comin' at 'Cha
"Let Me Know", a song by No Wyld, featured in FIFA 16
"Let Me Know", a song by Perfume from Future Pop
"Let Me Know", a song by Strawberry Milk from The 1st Mini Album EP
"Let Me Know", a song by BTS from the album Dark & Wild
"Let Me Know", a song by LANY from the album Malibu Nights
"Let Me Know", a 2007 song from Collie Buddz' eponymous album
"Let Me Know (I Have a Right)", a 1979 song by Gloria Gayner from the album I Have a Right